Akan may refer to:

People and languages
Akan people, an ethnic group in Ghana and Côte d'Ivoire
Akan language, a language spoken by the Akan people
Kwa languages, a language group which includes Akan
Central Tano languages, a language group which includes Akan

Places
Akan (Ghana parliament constituency)
Akan District, Hokkaido, Japan
Akan, Hokkaido, a town in Akan District, Hokkaido
Akan National Park
Akan Volcanic Complex, a volcano in Hokkaidō, Japan
Lake Akan, a lake in Hokkaidō, Japan
Akan River, a river in Hokkaidō, Japan
Akan, Wisconsin, a town in the United States

Other uses
Akan (surname), a surname
Akan (biblical figure), a person mentioned in the Book of Genesis
Akan (Maya god), a deity in Maya religion (identified with the god A')
Akan (あかん), a Japanese Kansai dialect phrase meaning "No way"

See also 
 Acan (disambiguation)
 Akkan

Language and nationality disambiguation pages